At the Top of the Pyramid is a 2014 American teenage drama film directed by Lawrence Jordan and starring Steve Guttenberg, Dean Cain, and Elle McLemore.

Premise
A young cheerleader attempts to overcome her inner demons after being traumatized by a tragic incident at a cheer leading competition.

Cast
Elle McLemore as Jamie Parker
Jessica Luza as Diana Price
Najla Bashirah as Pam Wilson
Michael Peterson as CW
Isaac J. Sullivan as Marcuss Brown
Miguel Jarquin-Moreland as Miguel Guerro
Patrick James Lynch as Andrew
Dean Cain as Jefferson Parker
Steve Guttenberg as Principal Dickson

Production
The film was shot in Centreville, Virginia, Arlington County, Virginia and Fairfax, Virginia.

Reception
Frank Scheck of The Hollywood Reporter gave the film a negative review, writing that it "doesn't manage to attack the crowd."

References

External links
 

2014 films
American teen drama films
Films shot in Virginia
2014 drama films
2010s English-language films
2010s American films